James Burrell Smith (1822-1897) was a watercolour and landscape artist. He was born in London. In 1843 he moved to Alnwick, Northumberland where he trained with Thomas Miles Richardson. He travelled around the UK and Europe. In the 1880s he created some engravings for The Illustrated London News.

"...two charming waterfalls by J. Burrell Smith, who stands unrivalled as a limner of such picturesque pieces of nature", North British Daily Mail, 27 December 1877, p4 in a piece on a fine art sale at Robert McTear & Co.

He died at 1a, Mornington Avenue, West Kensington on 16 December 1897.

Family

James Burrell Smith was baptised in Stepney on 12 April 1829. His parents are listed as James, a revenue officer, and Sarah. He married Eleanor Laidler at Edlingham, Northumberland on 24 April 1850.

In the 1871 census, he was living at 13, Scarsdale Villas, Kensington, aged 47, occupation Landscape Painter and birthplace, Stepney, Middlesex.

His second daughter, Sarah Emma Burrell Smith (1854-1943), known as Cissie, was also a landscape watercolour artist.

References

External links
James Burrell Smith at Art UK.
James Burrell Smith in National Trust collections.
Landscape with Cattle by James Burrell Smith, The Lytham St Annes Art Collection.
 List of Auction Records: Benezit Dictionary Of Artists, Rouco-Sommer, 2006. (Available to borrow at the Internet Archive)

English landscape painters
1822 births
1897 deaths